Chubbuck is a city in Bannock County, Idaho. It is part of the Pocatello Metropolitan Statistical Area. The population was 13,922 at the 2010 census. Chubbuck is located immediately north of Pocatello, Idaho, and has opposed several consolidation proposals since the 1960s.

Geography

The area's main shopping mall is Pine Ridge Mall.

Government
The mayor of Chubbuck is Kevin B. England.

Demographics

2010 census
As of the census of 2010, there were 13,922 people, 4,732 households, and 3,586 families living in the city. The racial makeup of the city was 90.5% White, 0.4% African American, 2.4% Native American, 1.1% Asian, 0.3% Pacific Islander, 2.3% from other races, and 3.0% from two or more races. Hispanic or Latino of any race were 7.5% of the population.

There were 4,732 households, of which 44.7% had children under the age of 18 living with them, 60.0% were married couples living together, 11.0% had a female householder with no husband present, 4.8% had a male householder with no wife present, and 24.2% were non-families. 19.9% of all households were made up of individuals, and 8.3% had someone living alone who was 65 years of age or older. The average household size was 2.94 and the average family size was 3.40.

The median age in the city was 30.2 years. 33.5% of residents were under the age of 18; 8.4% were between the ages of 18 and 24; 27.9% were from 25 to 44; 20.3% were from 45 to 64; and 10% were 65 years of age or older. The gender makeup of the city was 48.6% male and 51.4% female.

2000 census
As of the census of 2000, there were 9,700 people, 3,190 households, and 2,491 families living in the city. The racial makeup of the city was 91.80% White, 0.35% African American, 2.00% Native American, 1.09% Asian, 0.04% Pacific Islander, 2.47% from other races, and 2.24% from two or more races. Hispanic or Latino of any race were 5.38% of the population.

There were 3,190 households, out of which 45.4% had children under the age of 18 living with them, 63.4% were married couples living together, 10.7% had a female householder with no husband present, and 21.9% were non-families. 18.4% of all households were made up of individuals, and 7.2% had someone living alone who was 65 years of age or older. The average household size was 3.02 and the average family size was 3.46.

In the city, the population was spread out, with 33.9% under the age of 18, 10.5% from 18 to 24, 27.6% from 25 to 44, 19.3% from 45 to 64, and 8.7% who were 65 years of age or older. The median age was 29 years. For every 100 females, there were 97.6 males. For every 100 females age 18 and over, there were 93.4 males.

The median income for a household in the city was $41,688, and the median income for a family was $48,138. Males had a median income of $40,726 versus $25,230 for females. The per capita income for the city was $15,936. About 9.1% of families and 12.0% of the population were below the poverty line, including 15.1% of those under age 18 and 6.6% of those age 65 or over.

Education
Chubbuck is a part of the Pocatello/Chubbuck School District. It has two elementary schools within the city limits. Zoned elementary schools serving Chubbuck include Chubbuck Elementary School, Rulon M. Ellis Elementary School, Syringa Elementary School in Pocatello, Wilcox Elementary School in Pocatello, and Tyhee Elementary School in Tyhee.

Residents are zoned to Hawthorne Middle School in Pocatello, Alameda Middle School in Pocatello, Irving Middle School in Pocatello, and a small portion of residents to the east of Interstate 15 are zoned to Franklin Middle School in Pocatello. Residents are zoned to Pocatello High School and Highland High School both in Pocatello.

See also
Idaho Central Credit Union

References

External links
  - City of Chubbuck

Cities in Idaho
Cities in Bannock County, Idaho
Pocatello, Idaho metropolitan area